Chattahoochee Plantation is an unincorporated community in Cobb County, Georgia, United States.

History
The area was previously incorporated as a city in 1961 in hopes of building a luxury housing development around a golf club. In 1968, state legislators extended the city's boundaries to cover the entire length of Cobb County as a way to prevent the City of Atlanta from expanding into Cobb County. In 1989, an attempt was made by nearby Sandy Springs, in Fulton County, to have their area annexed by Chattahoochee Plantation in order to function as an independent city from Atlanta. This, like other attempts to gain city status, was defeated when Tom Murphy, speaker of the house in the Georgia General Assembly, blocked the measure. Chattahoochee Plantation never organized a city government, and its city charter was revoked in 1995.

Chattahoochee Plantation includes gated communities, riverfront homes along Sope Creek and the Chattahoochee River, and private golf courses, including the Atlanta Country Club. Residents of Chattahoochee Plantation have a Marietta address, although they are outside Marietta city limits.

References

Unincorporated communities in Cobb County, Georgia
Unincorporated communities in Georgia (U.S. state)
Populated places established in 1961
Populated places disestablished in 1995